This is a list of television programs formerly and currently broadcast by TV Land.

Current programs

Syndicated
 Gunsmoke (April 29, 1996–present)
 The Andy Griffith Show (March 21, 2000–present)
 Bonanza (August 31, 2003–present) 
 M*A*S*H (January 1, 2007 – 2013; February 20, 2017–present)
 Roseanne (May 1, 2009–present)
 Everybody Loves Raymond (March 18, 2010–present)
 The King of Queens (October 24, 2011–present)
 The Golden Girls (March 16, 2013–present) 
 The New Adventures of Old Christine (June 2015–present) 
 Mom (2017—2018; June 13, 2022–present) 
 Two and a Half Men (July 2, 2018–present) 
 The Goldbergs  (September 23, 2018–present) 
 Mike & Molly (October 15, 2021 – present)
 Seinfeld (February 11, 2023–present)

Former programs

Originals

Syndicated

 227 (2006–2007)
 30 Rock (2013)
 3rd Rock from the Sun (2008–2010)                                                                                              
 The A-Team (2000–2002; 2006–2007)
 The Abbott and Costello Show (1998–2000)
 Adam-12 (1999–2001)
 The Addams Family (1996–1998; 2004–2008) 
 The Adventures of Superman (2002–2004)
 Airwolf (1999–2001)
 ALF (2004)
 Alfred Hitchcock Presents (1999–2001)
 All in the Family (1998–2011)
 America's Funniest Home Videos (2010-2015) (Bob Saget seasons 1–5)
 Archie Bunker's Place (2002–2003)
 The Bad News Bears (1997–1999)
 Baretta (1999; 2001)
 Barney Miller (2000–2003)
 Batman (2002–2004)
 Becker (2009–2011)
 Benson (2006–2007)
 The Beverly Hillbillies (2001–2002; 2007–2010; 2014–2015)
 Bewitched (2004–2006; 2010–2011; 2015)
 The Bob Newhart Show (2000–2004)
 Bosom Buddies (1997–1998)
 Boston Legal (2010–2014)
 The Brady Bunch (2001–2010; 2013–2015)
 The Brady Kids (1996; 1998–1999)
 Brooklyn Bridge (1996–1998)
 Burke's Law (1996–1998; 2003)
 The Burns and Allen Show (2002–2004)
 Cannon (1996–1998)
 Carol Burnett and Friends (2004–2005)
 Charlie's Angels (2000–2003)
 Cheers (2004–2008)
 Chico and the Man (2000–2002; 2005)
 China Beach (2000)
 The Cosby Show (2006–2010; 2012–November 19, 2014)
 CSI: Crime Scene Investigation (2009–2010)
 Curb Your Enthusiasm (2013–2015)
 Daniel Boone (1997–1999; 2006)
 Day by Day (1996–2000)
 Dennis the Menace (2002–2003)
 Designing Women (2007–2008)
 The Dick Van Dyke Show (2000–2006; 2011–2013)
 The Donna Reed Show (2001–2003; 2005)
 Dragnet (1999–2001; 2005)
 The Dukes of Hazzard (2015)
 The Ed Sullivan Show (1996–1998; 2001)
 Emergency! (1999–2001)
 Extreme Makeover: Home Edition (2007–2013)
 F Troop (2000–2001; 2005)
 The Facts of Life (2000–2001; 2015–2016)
 Family Affair (1998–1999; 2001)
 Family Feud (2014–2016)
 Fantasy Island (2003–2004)
 Father Knows Best (2001–2004)
 Fernwood 2 Night (2002–2003)
 The Flip Wilson Show (1997–2001; 2004–2007)
 The Flying Nun (2002–2003)
 Fonz and the Happy Days Gang (1999)
 Friends (2013–2015)
 The Fugitive (2000; 2004)
 George Lopez (2016)
 Get Smart (1999; 2001–2003; 2005)
 Gilligan's Island (2002–2003; 2014–2016)
 Gomer Pyle, U.S.M.C. (2000–2002)
 Good Times (2005–2012)
 Green Acres (1996–1999; 2004–2009)
 Happy Days (2002–2007)
 Harlem Globetrotters (1999)
 Have Gun, Will Travel (1996–2000)
 Hazel (2001–2003)
 Heckle and Jeckle with Quackula (1999)
 Highway to Heaven (2005–2007)
 Hill Street Blues (1996–2000)
 Hogan's Heroes (1996–2002; 2008–2010; 2014–2015)
 Home Improvement (2010–2013)
 The Honeymooners (2000–2003)
 Honey West (1996–1999)
 How I Met Your Mother (2015-2018)
 H.R. Pufnstuf (1997; 1999; 2004)
 Hunter (2004–2006)
 I Dream of Jeannie (1998–2000; 2003–2006; 2010–2011)
 I Love Lucy (2001–2008; 2012–2014)
 The Jeffersons (2001–2002; 2006–2012)
 The Joey Bishop Show (1997–1999)
 Johnny Ringo (1996–1999)
 Julia (1997–2000)
 Knight Rider (2006–2007)
 Kojak (1999–2001; 2005)
 Lancelot Link, Secret Chimp (1999)
 Laverne & Shirley (2001–2002; 2005)
 Leave it to Beaver (1998–2012)
 Lidsville (1997; 2004)
 Little House on the Prairie (2005–2010)
 The Lone Ranger (1997-1998)
 Love, American Style (1996–2000)
 The Love Boat (2001–2004)
 The Lucy-Desi Comedy Hour (2001–2004)
 MacGyver (2003–2006)
 Mad About You (2008)
 Mannix (1996–2002)
 The Many Loves of Dobie Gillis (1997–1999)
 Marcus Welby, M.D. (1999–2001)
 Married... with Children (2009–2011)
 The Mary Tyler Moore Show (2001–2003)
 Maude (1999–2001)
 McHale's Navy (1999–2001)
 Miami Vice (2005–2007)
 Mister Ed (1996–1998; 2003–2005)
 Mom (2017–2018)
 The Monkees (1997; 2002–2005)
  (1997–1998)
 The Munsters (1997–1998; 2000–2008)
 Murder, She Wrote (2012–2013)
 Murphy Brown (2006–2009)  
 My Three Sons (1998–2001)
 The Nanny (2010–2016)
 Nero Wolfe (1996–1999)
 The Neighborhood (2022-2023)
 The New Adventures of Mighty Mouse (1999)
 Night Court (2005–2008)
 The Odd Couple (2000–2002)
 One Day at a Time (2017 TV series) (2020, simulcast with Pop)
 Petticoat Junction (1996–2001; 2004)
 The Phil Silvers Show (1996–2001)
 Phyllis (1998–1999; 2001)
 Reba (2015-2019)
 Rhoda (1998–2001; 2005)
 The Rockford Files (2001–2002)
 The Rookies (2002)
 Room 222 (1997–2000)
 Sanford and Son (1998–2000; 2003–2012)
 Scrubs (2008–2009; 2011)
 Shane (1996–1999)
 Shazam! (2000–2004)
 Sigmund and the Sea Monsters (1997; 1999; 2004)
 Soap (2002–2004)
 The Sonny & Cher Comedy Hour (1996–1999; 2001)
 St. Elsewhere (1996–2000)
 Star Trek (2006–2010)
 Star Trek: The Animated Series (1998-1999)
 Taxi (1999; 2001–2002)
 That '70s Show (2012–2015)
 That Girl (1996–1998; 2006–2008)
 Three's Company (2003–2015)
 'Til Death (2013)
 Walker, Texas Ranger (2014–2015)
 The Waltons (2002–2005)
 Welcome Back Kotter (2000–2003; 2005)
 What's Happening!! (2005–2007)
 The White Shadow (1996–1999)
 Who's the Boss? (2014)
 Wings (2004–2008)
 WKRP in Cincinnati (2000; 2003)
 Younger (2021)

Sporadic/special airings

 Ace Crawford, Private Eye (1996; 1998)
 All Is Forgiven (1998–1999)
 America's Most Musical Family (one-off airing in 2019)
 American Dreamer (January 1998)
 Angie (1997–1999)
 The Associates (1996–1999)
 Bachelor Father (1999–2000)
 Barbary Coast (1996–1999)
 Best of the West (1996–1999)
 The Betty White Show (1998–2001)
 Blansky's Beauties (1996–1999)
 Bob (1997–1999)
 Bracken's World (1998; 2000)
 The Brady Brides (1996–1997; 1999)
 The Brady Bunch Hour (1998–1999)
  (1996; 1998)
 The Byrds of Paradise (1997–1998)
 Combat! (1999)
 Coronet Blue (1997)
 The Daily Show with Trevor Noah (2015)
 Dallas (2005)
 The Dean Martin Show (1997)
 The Defenders (2000)
 The Detectives (1997–1998)
 The Devlin Connection (1996–1998)
 The Dick Powell Show (1996–1998)
 Diff'rent Strokes (2001)
 Duet (1997–1999)
 Dusty's Trail (1998)
 The Electric Company (1999)
 Fatherhood (2005)
 Flying Blind (1998)
 Frank's Place (1998–1999)
 The Fresh Prince of Bel-Air (2005)
 Full House (2005)
 Good Company (1998)
 Grady (2002)
 The Great Adventure (1996; 1998–2000)
 He & She (1998; 2000)
 I'll Fly Away: Then and Now (1998)
 I Spy (1998)
 Ironside (1999–2001)
 It's a Living (2001)
 It Takes a Thief (1999–2000)
 The Jack Benny Show (1999–2000)
 Joanie Loves Chachi (1997–1998)
 Judd, for the Defense (1997–1999)
 Just Shoot Me! (2008)
 Lancer (1998)
 Lassie (2005)
 Laverne & Shirley in the Army (1998)
 The Lazarus Syndrome (1998)
 Legend (1998–1999)
 Leg Work (1997–1999)
 The Life of Riley (1997–1998)
 The Lloyd Bridges Show (1997)
 The Magician (1998–1999)
 Make Room for Daddy (2000; 2004–2005)
 The Man from U.N.C.L.E. (1999)
 The Master (1998)
 Mayberry R.F.D. (2000–2003; 2005)
 The Millionaire (1999)
 Misfits of Science (2000–2001)
 Mission: Impossible (1996–1997)
 The Mod Squad (1999)
 Mr. Sunshine (1996; 1998–1999)
 Mulligan's Stew (1996; 1998)
 The Nat King Cole Show (1998)
  (1996–1999)
 Open House (1997–2000)
 Our Miss Brooks (1997–1999)
 Platypus Man (1998)
 The Rogues (1996–1998)
 Roll Out (1997–1998)
 The Royal Family (1997–1998)
 Simon & Simon (2006)
 Sister Kate (1997–1998)
 South Park (2022)
 Stagecoach West (1997–1999)
 Stand By Your Man (1998; 2000)
 S.W.A.T. (2001–2002)
 The Untouchables (1997–1998)
 Wagon Train (1999; 2001)
 The Westerner (1996–1999)
 When Things Were Rotten (1996–1998)
 Who's Watching the Kids? (1996–1999)
 Working Girl (1997–1999)
 The Young Lawyers (1997–1998)
 Zane Grey Theater (1996–1999)

Specials
 AFI Awards
 The Comedy Awards
 The 50 Greatest TV Icons
 TV Land Awards
 TV Land Confidential
 TV Land Movies
 TV Land Top 100 Most Unexpected Moments in TV History
 TV Land Top Ten
 MTV Video Music Awards
 CMT Music Awards
 NAACP Image Awards
 BET Awards

References

Notes

Nickelodeon
TV Land